Bathyglypta is a small genus of sea snails in the family Columbellidae, the dove snails.

Species
There are three species within the genus Bathyglypta:
 Bathyglypta biconica Pelorce, 2017
 Bathyglypta erosa Pelorce, 2017
 Bathyglypta procera (Simone & Gracia, 2006)

References

Columbellidae